Bothmanskloof Pass is situated in the Western Cape province of South Africa, on the R46 (a regional road) between Malmesbury and Riebeek Kasteel. It is also sometimes called Bothmaskloof.

This pass takes travelers over the mountain of Kasteelberg, and down to the lush Riebeek Valley, where the old town of Riebeek Kasteel is situated. In this valley, there are vineyards, wheat fields, and olive groves. The vineyards produce some excellent quality wines. As a result, wine tours are popular here, and the wines are often paired with the locally grown olives.

There is a very deep cut through the top of the pass, which was created to ensure that the steep gradient is still safe for travelers to use. The cut is some 18 meters deep and the road is tarred.

There is a memorial situated just past Bothmanskloof's summit, which is dedicated to Pieter Cruythoff. He and his travelling companion, Pieter Meerhoff, discovered Kasteelberg and the Riebeek Valley on their trek to a mythical place. They named it after Jan van Riebeeck, who was one of the founders of Cape Town in 1652 and the administrator of the Dutch East India Company. These explorers claimed to have spotted quagga, black wildebeest, and rhinoceros in this verdant valley.

Nearby to Bothmaskloof are the towns of Riebeek-Kasteel and Riebeek West. Cape Town is about 84 kilometres away.

External links 
 Passes Index at Wild Dog Adventure Riding website
About Bothmaskloof, SA-Venues.com

Mountain passes of the Western Cape